Jubilee Sailing Trust is a charitable organisation in the United Kingdom which owns and until 2019 operated two square-rigged three-masted barques, the STS Lord Nelson and the SV Tenacious.

Aims
The Jubilee Sailing Trust, based in Southampton, is a sail training charity registered with the Charity Commission. Founded in 1978 with money from the Silver Jubilee of Elizabeth II fund by Christopher Rudd, a keen sailor, its aims are: "To integrate both able-bodied and disabled persons through Tall Ship sailing"..

Ships
In early pilot schemes including voyages in the square-rigged vessels the Marques, TS Royalist and (between 1982 and 1985) Søren Larsen, it was established that square-riggers were suitable for fulfilling the Trust's aims. Subsequently the Trust commissioned the building of the Lord Nelson (designed by Colin Mudie), which sailed on her maiden voyage from Southampton to Cherbourg on 17 October 1986, and the Tenacious (to a design by Tony Castro), which made her maiden voyage on 1 September 2000, also from Southampton.

STS Lord Nelson and SV Tenacious were pioneers in the world of tall ships.  They are the only two vessels which have been designed and purpose-built to allow people of all physical abilities to sail side-by-side on equal terms. There are 8 wheelchair cabins with two bunks each, with the remaining accommodation being 'dorm-style'. All beds are fixed single bunks. Both vessels are equipped with additional measures to allow for disabled people to sail, including: a speaking compass, visual and tactile alarms around the ship to supplement emergency announcements, disabled toilets, signage and diagrams in Braille, power-assisted steering for the ship's wheel, wheelchair lifts around the ship, wider passageways, and tactile markers to assist the visually impaired in finding their way around.

Activities
Each year the JST takes around 2,000 adults to sea, both able-bodied and physically disabled. Each ship can sail with up to 40 voyage crew, half of whom may be physically disabled and are guided through each task on board by eight or nine permanent crew members (professional seafarers) and three or more volunteer crew. The ships sail around the United Kingdom, Western Europe, the Canary Islands and the Caribbean.

From October 2012 to September 2014, STS Lord Nelson sailed around the world in the first JST circumnavigation, visiting 30 countries spanning all seven continents. In October 2013, STS Lord Nelson participated in the International Fleet Review 2013 in Sydney, Australia.

Emergency appeal and cutbacks
In June 2019, the JST announced an 'emergency appeal', with a week to save the charity. The charity's handling of the appeal and its aftermath raised criticism from many in the sail training world.

Despite raising more than £1m in five days, it was announced that STS Lord Nelson would cease its sailing programme by October. There was a further planned review of organisational structures to reduce core costs, with the intent to achieve a "stronger financial footing".

In early 2021, having laid alongside Bristol docks and in a state of significant disrepair, Lord Nelson was put up for sale.

Support
Despite a successful business model selling spaces on their tall ship, JST also relies on funding, donations, and corporate partnerships to achieve their vision.
As of 2022, JST has nine 'Champions' including: Actisense, Ardent Training, Classic Sailing, Cruising Association, easyBoat, English Braids, Hill Dickinson LLP, AH Monsen Ltd, and Swig Wines

See also

Sea Cadet Corps
Tall Ships Youth Trust
Stavros S Niarchos

References

External links
Jubilee Sailing Trust — official website

Sports organizations established in 1978
Charities for disabled people based in the United Kingdom
Sailing in the United Kingdom
Sail training associations
Organisations based in Southampton
Transport charities based in the United Kingdom
Youth organisations based in the United Kingdom
Charities based in Hampshire
1978 establishments in the United Kingdom
Disabled boating